Illinois Bend is an unincorporated community on Farm to Market Road 677 twenty miles northeast of Montague in the extreme northeastern corner of Montague County, Texas, United States. The community, which initially was called Wardville, after local landowner C. M. Ward, was settled in 1862 by a small group of families who moved to Texas from Illinois. The name was changed to Illinois Bend in 1877, when a post office was located there.

Early settlers were plagued by occasional raids from Comanche and Kiowa Indians who had been placed in the Leased Lands north of the Red River and on the eastern border of the Chickasaw Nation.

In 1885 the settlement had a population of 300, two gristmills, a number of cotton gins, a school, and several churches. By 1910 the town had been bypassed by rail lines, and its population had fallen to 112. The population was sixty-eight by the late 1940s, when one business operated there. The community's post office closed sometime after 1930. By the late 1960s, when the last population figures were reported for the community, only fifty-one persons lived in Illinois Bend.

References

External links
 Raids in Montague County

Unincorporated communities in Texas
Unincorporated communities in Montague County, Texas
Ghost towns in North Texas
1862 establishments in Texas